Mythili Ennai Kaathali is a 1986 Indian Tamil-language film written, directed and scored by T. Rajendar. The film stars Rajendar, Srividya and Amala in her feature debut. It was released on 4 February 1986.

Plot 

Manikkam loves Mythili but it turns out to be a one-sided love. He admires a story writer whose name is also Mythili. She falls in love with him after knowing about his personal tragedies.

Cast 

T. Rajendar as Manickam
Srividya
Amala as Mythili
Y. Vijaya as Kanaka
Vennira Aadai Moorthy
S. S. Chandran
Senthamarai in Guest Appearance
Usilai Mani
Sivaraman
Nagaraja Chozhan
Thyagu
Suresh Chakravarthy
Silambarasan

Production 
Mythili Ennai Kaathali is the feature film debut of Amala. She was cast as Rajendar wanted a trained classical dancer in that role.

Soundtrack 
The flm's music was composed by T. Rajendar who also wrote the songs. The songs attained popularity especially "En Aasai Mythiliye" which was later remixed in Manmadhan (2004) starring Rajendar's son Silambarasan.

Release and reception 
Mythili Ennai Kaathali was released on 4 February 1986. Jayamanmadhan of Kalki criticised the editing, dances and art direction, feeling that if the multitasking Rajendar handled them too the film may have come better. Rajendar won the Cinema Express Award for Best Music Director – Tamil.

References

External links 
 

1980s Tamil-language films
1986 films
Films directed by T. Rajendar
Films scored by T. Rajendar
Films with screenplays by T. Rajendar